Eoophyla tripunctalis is a moth in the family Crambidae. It was described by Samuel Constantinus Snellen van Vollenhoven in 1872. It is found in Cameroon, the Democratic Republic of the Congo, Ghana, Ivory Coast, Nigeria and Sierra Leone.

The base of the forewings is whitish ochreous with a yellowish antemedian fascia, which becomes whitish postmedially. The terminal area is yellow. The base of the hindwings is whitish with a yellow antemedian fascia.

References

Eoophyla
Moths described in 1872
Moths of Africa
Taxa named by Samuel Constantinus Snellen van Vollenhoven